The bestial beast is a Brazilian version of a centaur, originating in Portugal. The name can be translated either as bestial beast or ferocious beast and is often employed in a figurative sense to refer to anyone that is exceedingly angry.

According to legend, it is believed that it is the Devil who leaves hell during full-moon nights.

It has the body of a horse and a human torso. It runs through villages until it finds a tomb, where it disappears. The sound of its hooves is enough to terrorise people. A pack of dogs follow it; the Beast whips these, and any other animals it comes across.

According to legend, though terrible, it is not dangerous to people. The tradition says that when somebody sees its face, they go mad for several days, but then recover soon after.

Brazilian legendary creatures
Mythological hybrids